Ameritech Center or AT&T Ohio is a commercial high-rise building in Cleveland, Ohio. The building rises  in Downtown Cleveland as a part of the Erieview Plaza complex. It contains 16 floors, and was completed in 1983. AT&T Center currently stands as the 31st-tallest building in the city, tied in rank with the Penton Media Building and the Ohio Savings Plaza. The architectural firm who designed the building was Madison Madison International. AT&T Center contains offices of the Dallas-based AT&T Corporation.

AT&T in Cleveland was called Ohio Bell. Ohio Bell had been at Michigan Avenue (now vacated by Tower City Center) from 1890–1927, then they built the Huron Road complex from 1927–64, and moved to the Erieview Tower from 1964–83. In the late 1970s as more telephone technology had emerged, especially digital switching and more offices using computers, Ohio Bell needed more space. Erieview Tower did not have the space required, so Ohio Bell decided to build new headquarters at 45 Erieview Plaza.

Ground was broken on 13 July 1981 for Ohio Bell's new headquarters. It was designed by a Cleveland consortium of Dalton Dalton, Newport, and Little and Robert P. Madison International. Ohio Bell's construction of its new building occurred when Cleveland had its skyscraper boom in the 1980s. Ohio Bell, One Cleveland Center, and Eaton Center were all under construction at the same time.

The Ohio Bell Building opened in 1983 for business. The Ohio Bell Building has a mirror-like southern glass exposure which reflects the nearby Galleria at Erieview and the One Cleveland Center building. The north side has a curved glass shape to it. The building had undergone some name changes:

1983-1990 Ohio Bell
1990-1997 Ameritech 
1998-2006 SBC
2006–present AT&T

See also
 List of tallest buildings in Cleveland

References

Skyscraper office buildings in Cleveland

Office buildings completed in 1983